The citadel of Madrid was a star fort with three fortified enceintes constructed by the French Army during the Peninsular War, in the grounds of the Palacio del Buen Retiro, on the Retiro heights, outside the eastern gate of the city of Madrid.

Origins
Napoleon, on approaching Madrid, considered the vantage-ground of the heights of the Retiro key to taking the capital of Spain. He therefore set up, under cover of darkness, thirty guns opposite the earthworks which the Spanish troops had built there and other, smaller artillery in front of the other gates of the city, to distract the attention of the garrison. Before dawn, the Emperor sent another summons to surrender.
The Captain-General, Marquis of Castelar, suggested a suspension of arms for twelve hours, in answer to which the Napoleon ordered an immediate assault. Considerable damage was done to Madrid's other defences, but the real assault was delivered against the Retiro heights and, once breaches had been made, Villatte's division of Victor's corps stormed the position with ease. The Spanish garrison of this section of Madrid's defences consisted of a single battalion of new levies—the Regiment of Mazzaredo—and a mass of armed citizens. 

Joaquín Murat, the commander of the French Army in Spain, occupied Madrid in March 1808 with more than 40,000 veteran troops. While he was lodged at Chamartín, his chief of staff, Augustin Daniel Belliard, was commissioned to prepare Madrid's headquarters for 25,000 men by "taking charge of the Retiro and considering it a citadel of Madrid, under the orders of Grouchy".

The palace at the Retiro was converted into the French Army's headquarters. The gardens and trees were removed to build the enceintes and several buildings were demolished or converted into arsenals.

Apart from the artillery and Moncey's brigade of dragoons stationed at the Retiro, the rest of the French troops based in and around Madrid were stationed at the convent of San Bernardino, located where the current Ciudad Universitaria was built, in the streets of Leganitos and Fuencarral, and the districts of El Pardo and Carabanchel.

Prior to the Battle of Talavera (27–28 July 1809), King Joseph left Madrid 23 July, at the head of some 5,800 troops, to meet up with Victor's 23,000 troops, and Sebastiani's 17,500, to take the offensive against Cuesta at Torrijos, rather than letting him advance on Madrid.

Left behind was only one brigade of Dessolles's division, with a few Spanish levies, with which Belliard, the governor of the city, was expected to hold the capital; some 4,000 men, in all. Belliard had to be prepared to retreat into the Retiro fort, with his troops and the whole body of the Afrancesados and their families, if there was an insurrection, or if Venegas managed to reach the city from the east, or possibly Wilson, whose column was at Escalona (Toledo), just thirty-eight miles from Madrid, with a force that was believed to be much larger than it actually was.

Capitulation
Following the Battle of Majadahonda (11 August 1812), fought on the outskirts of the city, Wellington was able to liberate Madrid when, on 14 August 1812, the French garrison at the citadel, under Lafon Blaniac, the governor of the province of La Mancha, with some 2,000 men, mainly of the Army of Andalusia, and mostly conscripts, surrendered. Although the double enceinte and the star fort in the interior would have been effective against guerrilleros or insurgents, the place could not hold out for long against siege-guns.

Post-war transformation and use
The French fortifications and most of the remains of the palace were demolished during the reign of Fernando. The only buildings left standing of the original palace. were the Casón and the Salón de Reinos and the land was converted into gardens, until 1868–1869, when it was handed over to the Council of Madrid, as the public park of El Retiro.

Notes

References

Bibliography
 Pérez de Guzmán y Gallo Juan (1908) [2008]. El Dos de Mayo de 1808 en Madrid. (Editorial MAXTOR, ISBN 8497614194, 9788497614191.) Google Books

Buildings and structures completed in the 19th century
Demolished buildings and structures in Madrid
Castles in the Community of Madrid
Star forts in Spain
Former star forts
Former castles in Spain
Former military buildings and structures
Former palaces in Spain
Former buildings and structures in Madrid
19th century in Madrid
Fortifications in Spain